Maneka Gandhi v. Union of India, AIR 1978 SC 597, was a landmark decision of the Supreme Court of India in which the Court significantly expanded the interpretation of Article 21 of the Constitution of India. It overruled A. K. Gopalan v. State of Madras, which had implied the exclusiveness of fundamental rights, and established a relationship between Articles 14, 19, and 21 of the Constitution (known as the 'golden triangle' or 'trinity'), holding that a law depriving a person of 'personal liberty' must not violate any of them. Once again overruling A. K. Gopalan, the Court in this case held that a 'procedure' under Article 21 of the Constitution cannot be arbitrary, unfair, oppressive, or unreasonable.

The decision had a significant influence on Indian constitutional law and has been described as the moment when the Supreme Court of India rejected "three decades of formalist interpretation, and inaugurated a new path where Courts would expand the rights of individuals against the State, instead of limiting or contracting them."

Background
Maneka Gandhi's passport was impounded 'in the public interest' by an order dated 2 July 1977.  When reasons for impounding her passport was sought, the Government of India declined to provide any "in the interests of the general public."

Gandhi filed a writ petition under Article 32 of the Constitution of India, challenging the order on the grounds that it violated Articles 14, 19, and 21 of the Constitution. The Union responded in their written submissions that her passport was impounded because her presence was likely to be required in connection with legal proceedings before a 'Commission of Inquiry'.

Judgment
Justice P. N. Bhagwati delivered a judgment for a plurality of the Court, writing for himself and Justices Untwalia and Fazal Ali. Chief Justice Beg, Justice Chandrachud, and Justice Krishna Iyer wrote separate judgments concurring with the plurality. 

Justice Kailasam wrote a dissenting opinion.   

The Court did not pass an order on the specific matter of Maneka Gandhi's passport, writing that "[i]n view of the statement made by the Attorney-General that the Government is agreeable to consider any representation that may be made by the petitioner in respect of impounding of her passport . . . it is not necessary to formally interfere with the impugned order..."

References 

   Supreme Court of India cases